is a series of boxing video games released by Sega. The original arcade game was released in 1976. The game featured black-and-white graphics and critics have since identified it as the first video game to feature hand-to-hand fighting. It was a commercial success in Japan, where it was the third highest-grossing arcade video game of 1976. However, it is now considered a lost video game.

Sega released a remake to arcades in 1987, changing the side perspective of the original game to a third-person viewpoint from behind the boxer. Both games feature unique controls that simulate throwing actual punches. The 1987 remake was also successful, becoming Japan's fifth highest-grossing dedicated arcade game of 1988 and receiving positive reviews from critics.

Gameplay

The 1976 original featured gameplay viewed from a side-view perspective. It employed two boxing glove controllers, one for each player, which moved up and down for high and low punches, with an inward movement for striking. It used large monochrome sprite visuals for the graphics.

The 1987 game changed the perspective to behind the player's boxer. In addition, the player is given two punch controllers, one for each hand. Only a single-player mode was made available, in which the player faces a series of opponents in one-round, three-minute bouts. Players can swivel the cabinet to move their boxer from side to side.

Reception
The original 1976 game was a commercial success in Japan. On the first annual Game Machine arcade chart, Heavyweight Champ was the third highest-grossing arcade video game of 1976 in Japan, just below Taito's Ball Park (Tornado Baseball) and Speed Race DX.

The 1987 remake was also a commercial success. In Japan, Game Machine listed the 1987 version on their November 15, 1987 issue as being the fourth most-successful upright arcade unit of the month. It went on to become Japan's fifth highest-grossing dedicated arcade game of 1988.

The 1987 remake was also critically well-received. Advanced Computer Entertainment and Commodore User praised the game's unique controls but raised concerns that they might decrease the lifespan of the cabinets. Commodore User also had positive impressions of the game's graphics and gave the game a 9 out of 10 overall.

Related games
Sega reused the Heavyweight Champ name when they released the Sega Master System version of James "Buster" Douglas Knockout Boxing outside of North America. The game features a side perspective and is otherwise unrelated to the arcade games. It was not received well.

The 1991 Sega arcade game Title Fight also featured controls for left and right punches and a similar behind-the-boxer perspective as the 1987 game, along with two-player gameplay through use of a dual-monitor cabinet.

See also
List of Sega arcade games

Notes

References

External links

Heavyweight Champ (1976) at arcade-history

1976 video games
1987 video games
Arcade video games
Arcade-only video games
Boxing video games
Lost video games
Sega arcade games
Video games developed in Japan
Video games featuring black protagonists